The Whitlock Avenue station is a local station on the IRT Pelham Line of the New York City Subway. It is served by the 6 train at all times and is located at Whitlock Avenue and Westchester Avenue in the Bronx.

History 
The Whitlock Avenue station opened on May 30, 1920 as the Pelham Line was extended to East 177th Street from Hunts Point Avenue. The construction of the Pelham Line was part of the Dual Contracts, signed on March 19, 1913 and also known as the Dual Subway System. The Pelham Line was built as a branch of the Lexington Avenue Line running northeast via 138th Street, Southern Boulevard and Westchester Avenue. Initially, the extension was served by a shuttle service operating with elevated cars. Passengers transferred to the shuttle at Hunts Point Avenue.

Station layout

The station has three tracks and two side platforms. The center express track is used by the <6> service during weekdays in the peak direction. The station has covered-over old signs and a windscreen on the south end. The north end has a full canopy over the platform.

The station is adjacent to an abandoned railroad station called Westchester Avenue which was served by the New York, Westchester and Boston Railway (NYW&B), and the Harlem River Branch of the New York, New Haven and Hartford Railroad. Currently, the line is used by Amtrak. The former NYW&B line was at one time proposed to be converted into an extension of the IRT Dyre Avenue Line leading to this station, rather than its current terminus at East 180th Street on the IRT White Plains Road Line. The station is also located right next to the Sheridan Expressway.

Southbound, this is the last elevated station before the wholly underground stretch to Brooklyn Bridge station. Northbound, the line makes a right angle turn to the east and crosses the Bronx River via a truss bridge.

Exits
The mezzanine is wood and features frosted windows in a simulated 16-pane pattern. At one time there were doors to the fare control but they have been removed; doors from fare control to the street remain. Outside fare control, exit stairs lead to either southern corner of Westchester Avenue and Whitlock Avenue.

References

External links 

 
 Station Reporter — 6 Train
 The Subway Nut — Whitlock Avenue Pictures
 Whitlock Avenue entrances from Google Maps Street View
 Platforms from Google Maps Street View

IRT Pelham Line stations
New York City Subway stations in the Bronx
Railway stations in the United States opened in 1920
1920 establishments in New York City
Longwood, Bronx